Margaret Whyte (born 21 February 1940) is a Uruguayan visual artist.

Career
Margaret Whyte began her artistic activity in 1972 at the Círculo de Bellas Artes in Montevideo.

Her work includes paintings, soft sculptures, installations, and interventions. Whyte evokes the memory of the materials she uses – fragments of dresses, tablecloths, and bedspreads bring an intense color to her textile works in which she questions the ideals of beauty and their rituals – as a way to revalue the aesthetic independent of the beautiful.

Her assemblages are accumulations and layers of cut and torn, wrapped, tied, and sewn objects which propose a reflection on the situation of women, beauty, fashion, and their commercial logic.

In 2014 she received the Figari Award in recognition of her career.

Exhibitions
 Pinturas, Museum of Contemporary Art (MAC), Montevideo, 1992
 Las cosas mismas, Juan Manuel Blanes Museum, Montevideo, 1995
 Misterios y ritos, Museo del Gaucho y la Moneda, Montevideo, 1996
 Cajas de Petri, Sala Vaz Ferreira, Montevideo, 1999
 Espacios medios, Molino de Pérez, Montevideo, 2001
 Cuerpos atávicos, Colección Engelman-Ost, 2003
 Hasta que duela, Cabildo de Montevideo, 2003
 Pliegues, 2007
 Kanga, intervention, CCE elevator, Montevideo, 2008
 Madame Butterfly, intervention, Solís Theatre staircase, Montevideo, 2009
 Belleza compulsiva, National Museum of Visual Arts, 2009
 Lo que queda, Contemporary Art Show, 2012

Awards
 Acquisition Award, 39th National Salon of Plastic and Visual Arts, 1975
 Ministry of Tourism Award, 6th Spring Biennale, Salto, 1996
 Special and Acquisition Award, Centennial Painting Salon of the Banco República, 1997
 Spring Biennale Award, Salto, 1998
 Figari Award for Career, MEC-BCU, 2014

References

External links
 
 Belleza compulsiva at the National Museum of Visual Arts

1940 births
Living people
20th-century Uruguayan painters
20th-century Uruguayan women artists
21st-century Uruguayan women artists
Artists from Montevideo
Uruguayan women painters